Ryan Van Duzer (born 21 January 1979) is an American filmmaker.

Professional work
Duzer was the host of 'Remote and Refined,' an outdoor adventure web series on Men's Journal, and he also appeared in the viral video "Sh*t Cyclists Say" on YouTube to promote People for Bikes campaign. In 2018, Ryan hosted Pure Cycles TV on YouTube.

References

External links
 DuzerTV
 Duzer's YouTube Channel

1979 births
Living people
American television hosts
People from Boulder, Colorado